The 2023 European Beach Handball Championship was held in Nazaré, Portugal from 24 to 28 May 2023.
All results, schedules and news regarding the EHF Beach Handball EURO can be found at site.

Format 
The men's and women's competition begins in the preliminary round with sixteen teams, divided into four groups. The top two teams from each group advance to the Main Round where they are divided into two groups of four, while the third and fourth teams are sent to the Consolation Round in two groups of four. Four teams in two groups of the main round play 1st and 4th, 2nd and 3rd and advance to the quarterfinals, followed by the semifinals and finals. Teams eliminated in the main round continue to play against teams from the consolation round. The groups in the preliminary round play a round-robin, while in the main round they only play against teams they have not played before, since the results of the preliminary round carry forward into the main round only in team matches who passed on

Men's Tournament

Preliminary round

Group A

Group B

Group C

Group D

Main round

Group I

Group II

Women's Tournament

Preliminary round

Group A

Group B

Group C

Group D

Main round

Group I

Group II

References

European Beach Handball Championship